Vice-Admiral Robert Claude Simpson-Anderson  (born July 1942 in Pretoria, South Africa) is a former Chief of the South African Navy (1 September 1992 – 31 October 2000)

He joined the Navy in 1964 and completed a BMil. In 1977 he commanded the Navy's first Strike Craft, . In 1978 he completed an MBL via Unisa. At the end of 1990 he was promoted to rear admiral and posted as Chief of Naval Support.

Awards and decorations

In 1999 Vice Admiral Simpson-Anderson was awarded the Order of the Star of South Africa (Silver). His list of awards includes:

References

South African admirals
1942 births
Living people
People from Pretoria
Chiefs of the South African Navy
Alumni of Diocesan College, Cape Town